Esper is an open-source Java-based software product for Complex event processing (CEP) and Event stream processing (ESP), that analyzes series of events for deriving conclusions from them.

Esper extends the SQL-92 standard for its engine and enterprise framework, providing Aggregate function, Pattern matching, event windowing and joining. Esper implements Event-driven programming and event-driven architecture.

Esper was created in 2006 by EsperTech Inc. It offers a Domain-specific language for processing events called Event Processing Language (EPL). EPL is a Declarative programming language for analyzing time-based event data and detecting situations as they occur.

Esper is a Java-based application but has been ported to the C# programming language and is available for the .NET Framework under the name NEsper.

EsperTech Inc. provides Esper Enterprise Edition with enterprise-ability features.

Example
This example illustrates a simple EPL query that outputs a row immediately when within a sliding window of 3 minutes the number of order events reaches 5 or more events.

select count(*) from OrderEvent#time(3 min) having count(*) >= 5

Related systems 
 Rapide (Stanford)
 StreamSQL: StreamSQL is a query language that extends SQL with the ability to process real-time data streams.

See also
 Complex event processing (CEP) - A related technology for building and managing event-driven information systems.
 Data Stream Management System (DSMS) - A type of software system for managing and querying data streams 
 Event correlation
 Event-driven architecture — (EDA)  is a software architecture pattern promoting the production, detection, consumption of, and reaction to events.
 Event stream processing — (ESP) is a related technology that focuses on processing streams of related data.
 Operational intelligence — Both CEP and ESP are technologies that underpin operational intelligence.
 Pattern matching
 Real-time business intelligence — Business Intelligence is the application of knowledge derived from CEP systems
 Real-time computing — CEP systems are typically real-time systems
 Real time enterprise

References

External links
 Esper Official Website
 EsperTech Inc.
 Research Papers referencing Esper, by Google Scholar
 Analysis of Complex Event Processing with Esper by Eric Miller, a book on Esper and CEP.
 Event Processing in Action by Opher Etzion and Peter Niblett, Manning Publications, a book that provides Esper examples
 Open Source SOA by Jeff Davis, Manning Publications, a book that provides examples of Esper for monitoring web services
 OSWorkflow: A guide for Java developers and architects to integrating open-source Business Process Management, by Diego Adrian Naya Lazo, PACKT, a book with a chapter on Esper
 Fraunhofer CEP Market Overview, by Fraunhofer, year 2010
 Forrester Wave for Complex Event Processing, by Forrester - Oct. '09
 Real-Time Stream Processing as Game Changer in a Big Data World with Hadoop and Data Warehouse, InfoQ - Sept. '14

Events (computing)
Java (programming language) software
Free business software